Swear It Was a Dream was released by Joe Firstman on his own 1stMan Music label in 2011. CD copies were available at shows, and digital copies of the album are available through the iTunes Store, Amazon Music, and Bandcamp.

Track listing
 "Take the Rain" – 3:30
 "Angel Moon" – 3:37
 "Carolina" – 2:44
 "Who's Turning Your Light Out?" – 2:05
 "Standin' on the Porch" – 3:32
 "Birthday Party" – 2:30
 "Wild Fire" – 2:12
 "Born Dreamer" – 2:50
 "Falling White Flowers" – 2:26
 "Gone" – 2:17

References

2011 albums
Joe Firstman albums